The London Academy of Excellence, Stratford (LAE) is a selective free school sixth form college located in the Stratford area of the London Borough of Newham, England. It has approximately 480 pupils and 32 teachers.

Background
The school first opened in 2012 in collaboration with seven independent schools - Brighton College, Caterham School, Eton College, City of London School, Forest School, Highgate School and University College School, six of which continue to support the school as 'partner schools'. Its close relationship with Eton College has led to the school being dubbed 'the Eton of the East End' by the national media.

LAE is a flagship of the government's academies programme. It was visited by Michael Gove in February 2014, who called it a "superb new free school". As well as state funding, the school receives a grant annually from HSBC and other corporate donors, and thus is able to offer sports and recreation activities, clubs, societies, a lecture programme and an outreach program to complement academic studies.

The school offers an academic A-Level curriculum designed to facilitate student's entry on to competitive degree courses at leading universities.  Conditional offers of places are made on the basis of student's predicted GCSE results.  For 2018 entry, students require a minimum of 5 GCSE 7-9 grades, including a minimum of grade 6 in Mathematics and either English Language or English Literature.

In 2015, the Sunday Times awarded the school with the title of 'The Sunday Times Sixth-form College of The Year'. It was the first free school to be named the best sixth form in the country". In 2016 eight students gained offers from Oxford University and the University of Cambridge, receiving much national media attention.

In June 2022 the school was short listed in the top 10 schools for the World's Best School Prize in the category of 'Supporting Healthy Living' in recognition of the extensive wellbeing offer in the school.

Results
The school was inspected in October 2017 and was awarded “outstanding” in all areas.

In 2019, LAE achieved record results with 65% of all A-Levels grades A*/A, and 93% A*-B.  More than 850 LAE students have taken up places at Russell Group universities since the first cohort left in 2014, 67 attended Oxford and Cambridge, and 95 have embarked on highly competitive medicine, veterinary medicine and dentistry courses.

Controversies

In 2022 a small group of LAE alumni working with Cage UK, MEND and Azad Ali list a number of allegations against the school, that the school released a statement refuting.

In March 2022 the school appointed an external investigator to investigate the complaint, concluding that there is no evidence that the LAE or any of its staff, either past or serving, discriminated against Muslim students and finds that the School’s Governing Board acted appropriately and transparently in its decision to discontinue multi-faith facilities at LAE in September 2015. Independent from the campaign the school has facilitated the use of on-site space for students wishing to pray.

References

Sixth form colleges in London
Education in the London Borough of Newham
Educational institutions established in 2012
Free schools in London
2012 establishments in England